Kordula Kovac (born 22 October 1957) is a German politician of the CDU who has been serving as a member of the Bundestag for the state of Baden-Württemberg from 2013 to 2017 and again from 2021 to 2022.

Political career 
Kovac became a member of the Bundestag in 2021 when she replaced Nikolas Löbel  who had resigned. In parliament, she has since been serving on the Defence Committee.

References

External links 

 Bundestag biography 

 

1957 births
Living people
Members of the Bundestag for Baden-Württemberg
Female members of the Bundestag
21st-century German women politicians
Members of the Bundestag 2017–2021
Members of the Bundestag 2013–2017
Members of the Bundestag for the Christian Democratic Union of Germany